Veppilankulam also known as Vembai is a village panchayat of Veppilankulam in Radhapuram taluk in Tirunelveli district in the Indian state of Tamilnadu

Geography

By road it is 8 km east from Panagudi .

Access

Rail 

Railway Station : VALLIYUR (VLY) - 14.5 km, KANYAKUMARI (CAPE) - 30 km.

Air 
Domestic Airport : TUTICORIN, Tamil Nadu - 90 km.

International Airport : TRIVANDRUM, Kerala - 103 km.

Villages in Tirunelveli district